Dicipivirus is a genus of viruses in the order Picornavirales, in the family Picornaviridae. Dog serve as natural hosts. There are two species in this genus.

Taxonomy
The genus contains the following two species:
Cadicivirus A
Cadicivirus B

Structure
Viruses in Dicipivirus are non-enveloped, with icosahedral, spherical, and round geometries, and T=pseudo3 symmetry. The diameter is around 30 nm. Genomes are linear and non-segmented, around 8.8kb in length. The genome has 2 open reading frames.

Life cycle
Viral replication is cytoplasmic. Entry into the host cell is achieved by attachment of the virus to host receptors, which mediates endocytosis. Replication follows the positive stranded RNA virus replication model. Positive stranded RNA virus transcription is the method of transcription. The virus exits the host cell by lysis, and viroporins. Dogs serve as the natural host.

References

External links
 Viralzone: Dicipivirus
 ICTV

Picornaviridae
Virus genera